Force Ministries is a Christian-based organization targeting members of both the military and law enforcement. Its stated purpose is to impart faith in Christ, instill patterns and principles for victorious Christian duty and ignite individual calling and destiny.

History and Links
Force Ministries, part of the Every Nation group, was incorporated on November 16, 2001 in Austin, TX as a subsidiary of Champions for Christ. Registered agents included Greg Ball, Jim Laffoon, and Greg Wark. Prior to becoming part of Every Nation, Champions for Christ was established in 1985 as part of the Maranatha Campus Ministries.

Current board members, according to Force Ministries website, include Greg Wark as president, along with Robert Owens and Art Smith.

See also
Champions for Christ
Every Nation
Maranatha Campus Ministries

References

External links
 Force Ministries

Evangelical organizations
Christian organizations established in 2001
2001 establishments in Texas